Standish is an unincorporated community in Carroll County, in the U.S. state of Missouri.

A post office called Standish was established in 1888, and remained in operation until 1955. A variant name was "Newcomb".

References

Unincorporated communities in Carroll County, Missouri
Unincorporated communities in Missouri